Tô Ngọc Vân (蘇玉雲, 15 December 1906 or 1908 – 17 June 1954), also known as Tô Tử, was a Vietnamese painter. Several of his paintings are being displayed at the Vietnam National Museum of Fine Arts. He taught a resistance art class in the northern zone during the war with the French, and died as the result of injuries received at the Battle of Điện Biên Phủ.
He was among the first recipients of the Ho Chi Minh Prize in 1996.

He worked as painting teacher in Bưởi school, professor at the École des Beaux-Arts de l’Indochine and principal of the Việt Bắc Art School and has had significant influence on a whole generation of artists in Vietnam.

Vân contributed to the magazines of Tự Lực văn đoàn ("Self-Strengthening literary group") by drawing cartoons on current events, social issues, and everyday live.

The To Ngoc Van (crater) on Mercury was named in his honour.

Life and career 
Ngọc Vân was born on December 15, 1906 (although some sources record his birth in 1908) in Xuan Cau village, Van Giang district, Hung Yen province.

Ngọc Vân was born as a poor boy and skipped school during his third year in high school to follow his dream of becoming an artist. In 1926, he was able to pass the entrance exam in the Vietnam University of Fine Arts during the first generation of the school and graduated two years later. Ngọc Vân painted many places in his artwork, some of which include Bangkok, Huế, and Phnom Penh. He was also a writer and art critic in the art press. He cooperated with the Vietnamese newspapers Phong Hóa và Ngày Nay and Thanh Nghị.

References

1900s births
1954 deaths
20th-century Vietnamese painters
People from Hưng Yên Province